Fuaava Suluimalo Amataga Penaia (born ~1966) is a Samoan politician. He is a member of the Human Rights Protection Party.

Fuaava is from Lufilufi and was educated at the University of the South Pacific, as well as the University of New England and Griffith University in Australia. From 2001 to 2005 he worked for the Samoa water Authority, before moving to the Ministry of Natural Resources and Environment. After serving as Assistant Chief Executive, he served as Chief Executive of MNRE until 2017. He subsequently served as a member of the Samoa Water Authority Board of Directors. He was first elected to the Legislative Assembly of Samoa in the 2021 Samoan general election.

References

Living people
Members of the Legislative Assembly of Samoa
Human Rights Protection Party politicians
Samoan civil servants
University of the South Pacific alumni
University of New England (Australia) alumni
Griffith University alumni
Year of birth missing (living people)